Debra L. Bogen is an American pediatrician and public health official who is the acting secretary of health of Pennsylvania.

Life 
Bogen earned a B.A. in chemistry, cum laude, from the Columbia University in 1985. She completed a M.D. at the University of Colorado School of Medicine in 1992. From 1992 to 1995, she completed a pediatric residency and general academic pediatrics fellowship at the Johns Hopkins School of Medicine. Bogen conducted postdoctoral research at the Johns Hopkins School of Medicine from 1996 to 1998. She became a fellow of the American Academy of Pediatrics in 1992. She joined the American Pediatric Society in 1996. In 2004, she became a fellow of the Academy of Breastfeeding Medicine in 2004.

Bogen is an advocate for maternal and child health issues. She is one of the founders of the Mid-Atlantic Mother's Milk Bank. At the University of Pittsburgh, Bogen held a primary academic appointment as a professor of pediatrics and secondary appointments in psychiatry and clinical and translational science. She was vice chair for education at the UPMC Children's Hospital of Pittsburgh's pediatric department. In March 2020, she succeeded Karen Hacker as director of the Allegheny County Health Department.

In January 2023, she was nominated by governor-elect Josh Shapiro to serve as the Pennsylvania Secretary of Health. Her nomination is subject to approval by the Pennsylvania State Senate.

References 

Living people
Year of birth missing (living people)
Place of birth missing (living people)
Columbia College (New York) alumni
University of Colorado School of Medicine alumni
University of Pittsburgh faculty
21st-century American women physicians
21st-century American physicians
Physician-scientists
Physicians from Pennsylvania
American medical researchers
American public health doctors
State cabinet secretaries of Pennsylvania
Women medical researchers
Women public health doctors